Çolpı is a village and municipality in the Saatly Rayon of Azerbaijan. The village was raised to municipality status in 2004.

References

Populated places in Saatly District